The men's high jump event at the 2000 World Junior Championships in Athletics was held in Santiago, Chile, at Estadio Nacional Julio Martínez Prádanos on 18 and 19 October.

Medalists

Results

Final
19 October

Qualifications
18 October

Group A

Group B

Participation
According to an unofficial count, 23 athletes from 19 countries participated in the event.

References

High jump
High jump at the World Athletics U20 Championships